Bimad (also Romanized as Bīmād; also known as Bīmār) is a village in Shakhen Rural District, in the Central District of Birjand County, South Khorasan Province, Iran. At the 2016 census, its population was 42, in 21 families.

References 

Populated places in Birjand County